Steiger is a German word for "climber" or "mine manager".

It may refer to:

People
Steiger (surname)

Organizations
Steiger (automobile company), a former German manufacturer
Steiger Award, a German award
Steiger Ferris Wheel, a transportable amusement ride
Steiger (mining), an official or manager of a pit or mine
Steiger Tractor, a former American manufacturer and brand

See also
Björn Steiger Foundation
De Steiger, a surname
Case STX Steiger